Nguyễn Khang (5 February 1912 in Hanoi – 15 November 1989) was a Vietnamese painter who specialized in lacquer painting, sometimes with relief work.

A few of his works are in the Vietnam National Museum of Fine Arts, Hanoi, but most are in private collections.

Selected works
Fishing under Moon Light 1943
Uncle Ho Visiting the Villages  1958  
Troops fording a stream  1960
Love -2020

References

1912 births
1989 deaths
20th-century Vietnamese painters